Emili Josep Isierte Aguilar (born 13 November 1963 in Amposta, Tarragona, Catalonia) is a Spanish retired footballer who played as a goalkeeper.

External links

1963 births
Living people
People from Montsià
Sportspeople from the Province of Tarragona
Spanish footballers
Footballers from Catalonia
Association football goalkeepers
La Liga players
Segunda División players
Segunda División B players
Tercera División players
CD Castellón footballers
Sporting de Gijón players
RCD Espanyol footballers
UE Lleida players
Catalonia international footballers